Petra Niemann (born 14 August 1978) is a German former yacht racer who competed in the 2000 Summer Olympics, in the 2004 Summer Olympics, and in the 2008 Summer Olympics.

Niemann posed nude in the German edition of Playboy in August 2008, alongside compatriots Nicole Reinhardt, Katharina Scholz and Romy Tarangul.

References

1978 births
Living people
German female sailors (sport)
Olympic sailors of Germany
Sailors at the 2000 Summer Olympics – Europe
Sailors at the 2004 Summer Olympics – Europe
Sailors at the 2008 Summer Olympics – Laser Radial
Sportspeople from Berlin